Miriam Diamond (born 1955) is an environmental chemist and a professor at the University of Toronto. She started the Professor Diamond's Environmental Research Group which works to develop strategies that reduce dangerous contaminants in the environment.

Diamond is appointed to numerous departments at various universities, is a member for Scientists 4 CEPA, an editor for the Environmental Science and Technology journal and was Co-chair of the Ontario Ministry of the Environment's Toxic Reduction Scientific Expert Panel.

Biography

Education 
Diamond received her PhD from the Department of Chemical Engineering and Applied Chemistry from the University of Toronto in 1990, MScEng in Mining Engineering from Queen's University (Kingston, Ontario) in 1984, MSc in Zoology from the University of Alberta in 1980 and BSc in biology from the University of Toronto in 1976.

Work 
Diamond is a Professor for the Department of Earth Sciences at the University of Toronto (July. 2012–Present). She is appointed to the Department of Chemical Engineering and Applied Chemistry, the Dalla Lana School of Public Health, School of the Environment, and the Department of Physical and Environmental Sciences at University of Toronto, Scarborough.

She is also an Associate Editor of the journal Environmental Science and Technology which is a leading journal in the field, a member of the Canadian Chemical Management Plan Science Committee and a member of the Board of Directors of the Canadian Environmental Law Association.

Diamond was Co-chair of the Ontario Ministry of the Environment's Toxic Reduction Scientific Expert Panel that advised the Minister of the Environment on the Toxic Reduction Act that was introduced in 2009.

Diamond started the Professor Diamond's Environmental Research Group which helps to establish strategies to reduce chemical contaminants in the environment. The main focus of their research is on systems that have relatively high levels of contaminants, including indoor environments and outdoor urban systems.

Diamond is also involved with Scientists 4 CEPA, who are a group of scientists concerned with the environment and the protection of Canada's natural ecosystems.

She has been involved in over 150 publications of work.

Honours and awards 

 1976 - Innis College Medal
 1981-1982 - Max Bell Scholarship for Northern Studies, McGill University
 1989 - John Brown Memorial Prize for Research in Environmental Science and Occupational Health, University of Toronto
 1989-1990 - George Burwash Langford Prize for distinctive contributions to environmental research and services to the Institute for Environmental Studies
 1999 - Ontario Ministry of the Environment Excellence in Research Award to Students
 1999-2002, 2004, 2005 - Dean’s Excellence Award, Faculty of Arts and Science, University of Toronto
 2005 - Joseph R. Meyerhoff Visiting Professorship. Weizmann Institute
 2007 - Canadian Environmental Scientist of the Year, Royal Canadian Geographical Society
 2010 - Fellow of the Royal Geographical Society
 2011 - INNOLEC Science Guest Chair in Chemistry, Masarykova University, Czech Republic
 2014 - Visiting Scientist, Stockholm University, Department of Applied Environmental Science
 2016 - SETAC Fellow
 2016 - University of Toronto Faculty of Arts and Science Deans Award

References

External links 
 Official Site

Living people
Canadian women chemists
University of Toronto alumni
Scientists from Toronto
21st-century Canadian women scientists
21st-century Canadian chemists
Academic staff of the University of Toronto
1955 births